Teote is a Latin American restaurant with multiple locations in Portland, Oregon.

History

The original restaurant, also known as Teote Areperia, opened in July 2013. The Alberta location opened in 2018. Plans for a restaurant in Pine Street Market were confirmed in December 2018.

Locations

Teote House Cafe is located at 1615 SE 12th Avenue in the Hosford-Abernethy neighborhood
Teote Mezcaleria is located at 2700 NE Alberta Street in the Concordia neighborhood
Teote Outpost is located at 126 SW 2nd Avenue within the Pine Street Market in downtown Portland

Reception
Teote has received positive reviews.

See also
 Hispanics and Latinos in Portland, Oregon

References

External links

 
 Teote at Zomato

2013 establishments in Oregon
Concordia, Portland, Oregon
Hosford-Abernethy, Portland, Oregon
Latin American restaurants in Portland, Oregon
Restaurants established in 2013
Restaurants in Portland, Oregon
Southwest Portland, Oregon